William F. Penney (1862 – 1934) was a merchant, judge and political figure in Newfoundland. He represented Carbonear in the Newfoundland and Labrador House of Assembly from 1919 to 1923 as a Liberal Reform party member. His surname also appears as Penny in some sources.

He was born in Carbonear, the son of Edgar Penney. He entered the family fishery supply business, later opening his own business. Penney married Julia Guy. He was speaker for the Newfoundland House of Assembly from 1920 to 1923. In 1923, he was named district court judge for Carbonear, succeeding his uncle Alfred Penney, who had also served in the Newfoundland assembly.

References 
 

Speakers of the Newfoundland and Labrador House of Assembly
1862 births
1934 deaths
People from Carbonear
Dominion of Newfoundland politicians
Dominion of Newfoundland judges